In enzymology, a hydrogenase (acceptor) is an enzyme that catalyzes the chemical reaction

H2 + A  AH2

Thus, the two substrates of this enzyme are H2 and A, whereas its product is AH2.

This enzyme belongs to the family of oxidoreductases, specifically those acting on hydrogen as donor with other acceptors.  The systematic name of this enzyme class is hydrogen:acceptor oxidoreductase. Other names in common use include H2 producing hydrogenase[ambiguous], hydrogen-lyase[ambiguous], hydrogenlyase[ambiguous], uptake hydrogenase[ambiguous], and hydrogen:(acceptor) oxidoreductase.

References

 
 
 

EC 1.12.99
Enzymes of unknown structure